Bitter yam is a common name for several species of yam and may refer to:

Dioscorea bulbifera, native to Africa and Asia
Dioscorea dumetorum, native to Africa